Pearsonia  is a genus of 12 species of plants belonging to the family Fabaceae and occurring in Africa south of the equator with 1 species found on Madagascar. The species are usually herbs or shrublets with woody rootstocks. Leaves are usually sessile and 3-foliolate. The inflorescence is a congested or lax terminal raceme. The name of this genus commemorates the South African botanist Henry Harold Welch Pearson.

Species
Pearsonia comprises the following species:
 Pearsonia aristata (Schinz) Dummer

 Pearsonia bracteata (Benth.) Polhill
 Pearsonia cajanifolia (Harv.) Polhill
 subsp. cajanifolia (Harv.) Polhill
 subsp. cryptantha (Baker) Polhill
 Pearsonia callistoma Campb.-Young & K.Balkwill

 Pearsonia flava (Baker f.) Polhill
 Pearsonia grandifolia (Bolus) Polhill
 subsp. grandifolia (Bolus) Polhill
 subsp. latibracteolata (Dummer) Polhill

 Pearsonia hirsuta Germish.
 Pearsonia madagascariensis (R. Vig.) Polhill

 Pearsonia mesopontica Polhill
 Pearsonia metallifera Wild

 Pearsonia obovata (Schinz) Polhill

 Pearsonia sessilifolia (Harv.) Dummer
 subsp. filifolia (Bolus)Polhill
 subsp. marginata (Schinz) Polhill
 subsp. sessilifolia (Harv.) Dummer

 Pearsonia uniflora (Kensit) Polhill

References

External links
Pearsonia sessilifolia
Pearsonia metallifera Wild
Pearsonia metallifera Wild

Crotalarieae
Fabaceae genera